Tursunoy Jabborova (born 4 March 2002) is an Uzbekistani weightlifter. She won the silver medal in the women's 87kg event at the 2021 World Weightlifting Championships held in Tashkent, Uzbekistan, and the bronze medal at the 2022 edition held in Bogotá, Colombia. She is also a three-time medalist, including two gold medals, at the Junior World Weightlifting Championships.

Career 

In 2019, she won the silver medal in the women's 76kg snatch event at the 6th International Qatar Cup held in Doha, Qatar.

In 2021, she won the gold medal in the women's 87kg event at the Junior World Weightlifting Championships held in Tashkent, Uzbekistan. She also won the gold medal in her event at the 2022 Junior World Weightlifting Championships held in Heraklion, Greece.

She won the gold medal in the women's 87kg event at the 2021 Islamic Solidarity Games held in Konya, Turkey. She won the bronze medal in her event at the 2022 Asian Weightlifting Championships held in Manama, Bahrain. She won the bronze medal in the women's 87kg event at the 2022 World Weightlifting Championships held in Bogotá, Colombia.

Achievements

References

External links 
 

Living people
2002 births
Place of birth missing (living people)
Uzbekistani female weightlifters
World Weightlifting Championships medalists
Islamic Solidarity Games competitors for Uzbekistan
Islamic Solidarity Games medalists in weightlifting
21st-century Uzbekistani women